Seif Palace (Arabic, قصر السيف) is a palace in Kuwait City, Kuwait. Located opposite the Grand Mosque, one of Seif Palace's best-known features is the watch tower, covered in blue tiles and with a roof plated in pure gold. Local materials such as clay, rocks, limestone, wood and metals were used in its construction.

Overview
The tower of the Seif Palace received a direct hit from an incoming missile during the first Gulf War (1990–91), which destroyed the dial room. Smith of Derby Group replaced the iconic clock, and were the only non-US company to be awarded a contract in this reconstructive period.

See also
Amiri Diwan of Kuwait
Timeline of Kuwait City

References

External links

 Palaces in Kuwait
 Buildings and structures in Kuwait City
 History of Kuwait